Slavko Matić (born 2 July 1976) is a Serbian football.

He is a holder of the UEFA Pro Licence.

He played for OFK Beograd, Spartak Moscow, PFC Slavia Sofia and PFC CSKA Sofia. Matić had a short stint as manager of Arda Kardzhali between 12 November and 16 December 2021, being released from his duties following a controversial interview, in which he revealed serious issues inside the club. Matic was hired as Septemvri Sofia coach, a team from the second tier of Bulgarian football, in early 2022.

In October 2022 he became the manager of Accra Hearts of Oak S.C.

References

External links
 Profile and stats at Srbijafudbal
 
 Slavko Matic at Footballdatabase

1976 births
Living people
Footballers from Belgrade
Serbian footballers
Association football defenders
FK Čukarički players
OFK Beograd players
FK BASK players
PFC Slavia Sofia players
PFC CSKA Sofia players
Serbian expatriate footballers
First Professional Football League (Bulgaria) players
Pegah Gilan players
Expatriate footballers in Iran
Expatriate footballers in Bulgaria
Expatriate footballers in Russia
Serbian expatriate sportspeople in Bulgaria
Serbian expatriate sportspeople in Slovenia
Serbian football managers
FC Spartak Moscow players